"Looks Aren't Everything" is a song written and recorded by American country music artist Mark Collie.  It was released in June 1990 as the second single from the album Hardin County Line.  The song reached #35 on the Billboard Hot Country Singles & Tracks chart.

Chart performance

References

1990 singles
1990 songs
Mark Collie songs
Songs written by Mark Collie
Song recordings produced by Tony Brown (record producer)
Song recordings produced by Doug Johnson (record producer)
MCA Records singles